The Long Christmas Dinner is a play in one act written by American novelist and playwright Thornton Wilder in 1931.  In its first published form, it was included in the volume The Long Christmas Dinner and Other Plays in One Act.

Characters

The characters, as they are listed in the script:

Lucia
Mother Bayard
Roderick
Cousin Brandon
Charles, son of Roderick and Lucia
Genevieve, daughter of Roderick and Lucia
The Nurse
Leonora, wife of Charles
Ermengarde
Sam, son of Charles and Leonora
Lucia II, daughter of Charles and Leonora
Roderick II, son of Charles and Leonora

Plot
Setting: 90 years in the dining room of the Bayard House.

Length: ~35 minutes

Summary: A one-act drama about several generations of one family:

A play whose action traverses ninety years and represents in accelerated motion ninety Christmas dinners in the Bayard home. The development of the countryside, the changes in customs and manners during this period of time as well as the growth of the Bayard family and their accumulation of property sums up vividly a wide aspect of American life. It is a serious play lightened with humor of character; it has a human, tender, moving quality both appealing and forceful.

Performance history

It was first performed jointly by the Yale Dramatic Association and the Vassar Philaletheis Society.

Currently, Samuel French, Inc., owns the rights to The Long Christmas Dinner.

Adaptation
In 1963, an operatic adaptation, with music by Paul Hindemith to text by Wilder, entitled The Long Christmas Dinner, was premiered at the Juilliard School of Music.

Influence
The Long Christmas Dinner inspired a famous scene in Orson Welles's 1941 film Citizen Kane — the breakfast-table montage in which the nine-year deterioration of Kane's marriage is told through a conversation seen in five vignettes. Several breakfast scenes were to be filmed, but during shooting Welles had the idea of simply photographing it as a continuous scene without dissolves, with the camera whipping back and forth.

"[The idea] was stolen from The Long Christmas Dinner of Thornton Wilder!" Welles told filmmaker Peter Bogdanovich. "I did the breakfast scene thinking I'd invented it. It wasn't in the script originally. And when I was almost finished with it, I suddenly realized that I'd unconsciously stolen it from Thornton and I called him up and admitted to it." When Bogdanovich asked how Wilder reacted, Welles replied, "He was pleased." Welles and Wilder were good friends.

References

External links
The Long Christmas Dinner Further Commentary; by The Thornton Wilder Society
The Long Christmas Dinner Teaching Materials; by The Thornton Wilder Society

Plays by Thornton Wilder
1931 plays
One-act plays
Coward-McCann books